Todd A. Kessler (born 1972) is an American screenwriter, playwright, television producer and director.

Career
Kessler wrote and produced the second and third seasons of HBO's The Sopranos, Michael Mann's Robbery Homicide Division and the first season of NBC's Providence. Kessler began his career as a playwright working with David Rabe, moving into film and television when Spike Lee hired him as a screenwriter.  Kessler is credited with co-writing (with David Chase) the Sopranos season 2 finale Funhouse -- widely lauded as one of the best episodes of the series.  

Despite his success on The Sopranos, HBO did not retain Kessler beyond season 3, an experience Kessler described as "painful and formative."  Kessler and Sopranos actor James Gandolfini became close friends during Kessler's time writing for the show.

He is the co-creator and head writer of the Golden Globe award-winning FX drama series Damages along with his older brother, Glenn Kessler, and Daniel Zelman. He also has a small role in Damages as Perry the Doorman.

In 2015, his Kyle Chandler-led Netflix series Bloodline premiered. In 2016 it was cancelled, and ended its run after its third season in 2017.

Education
After graduating from Cranbrook Kingswood School, Kessler graduated magna cum laude from Harvard University with a degree in dramatic literature and playwriting, and has twice been a visiting artist at Harvard, teaching screenwriting seminars.

Awards and nominations
Kessler has been nominated for several Primetime Emmy Awards. Todd A. Kessler, Glenn Kessler and Daniel Zelman were nominated for an Emmy Award for Outstanding Writing for a Drama Series for their work on the Damages pilot episode "Get Me A Lawyer".

Kessler has been nominated for five Emmy Awards and three Golden Globe Awards.

References

External links 

Damages official website containing Todd A. Kessler biography
Interview with Todd A. Kessler, Glen Kessler, and Daniel Zelman at TV Guide

American television directors
American television writers
American male television writers
Damages (TV series)
Living people
Place of birth missing (living people)
1972 births
Showrunners
Harvard University alumni
Cranbrook Educational Community alumni
Television producers from Michigan